

Belgium
 International Association of the Congo / Congo Free State 
 Francis Walter de Winton, Administrator-General of the International Association of the Congo (1884–1885)
 Maximilien Straunch, President of the International Association of the Congo (1885)
 Francis Walter de Winton, Administrator-General of the Congo Free State (1885–1886)
 Note: International Association of the Congo internationally recognized by the Berlin Conference on February 23, 1885.  Renamed Congo Free State by King Leopold II on July 1, 1885.

France
 Obock and Tadjoura – Léonce Lagarde, Commandant of Obock and Tadjoura (1884–1887)
 Riviéres du Sud – Jean-Marie Bayol, Lieutenant-Governor of Riviéres du Sud (1882–1891)

Portugal
 Angola – Francisco Joaquim Ferreira do Amaral, Governor-General of Angola (1882–1886)

United Kingdom
 Malta Colony – Lintorn Simmons, Governor of Malta (1884–1888)
 New South Wales 
 Lord Augustus Loftus, Governor of New South Wales (1879–1885)
 Charles Wynn-Carington, Lord Lincolnshire, Governor of New South Wales (1885–1890)
 Queensland – Sir Anthony Musgrave, Governor of Queensland (1883–1888)
 Tasmania – Major George Strahan, Governor of Tasmania (1881–1886)
 South Australia – Sir William Robinson, Governor of SouthAustralia (1883–1889)
 Victoria – Henry, Lord Loch, Governor of Victoria (1884–1889)
 Western Australia – Sir Frederick Broome, Governor of Western Australia (1883–1890)

Colonial governors
Colonial governors
1885